Hermes is a character in DC Comics. He is based on the Greek god of the same name.

Publication history
Hermes debuted in Wonder Woman #1 and was adapted by William Moulton Marston and Harry G. Peter.

Fictional character biography
Hermes is the Messenger of the Gods. He assisted in turning a baby sculpture that Queen Hippolyta made into a real baby, resulting in the origin of Princess Diana.

In the Post-Crisis, Hermes was present at a meeting with fellow Gods in to talk about the dwindling worshipping from the mortals. After Zeus deemed this issue beneath him and left, Hermes accompanied Aphrodite, Ares, Athena, Demeter, and Hestia to the Underworld and the Cavern of Souls, where Gaia has housed the souls of women who have been unjustly killed by men. They harvest the souls to reincarnate them into Amazons and give them a home on Themyscira. One of the souls had been saved by Athena for the day when Hippolyta would sculpt a baby out of shoreline clay wherein Athena would infuse the baby sculpture with that spirit enabling Princess Diana to be born.

During the War of the Gods storyline, Hermes was destroyed by Circe. Hermes' body was later retrieved from the Underworld

In The New 52 reboot of DC's continuity, Hermes is first seen with Wonder Woman, instructing her to protect Zola because Hera wants her dead. Hermes and Zola were later seen walking through the woods when they are approached by Aphrodite. When Hermes states to Zola that Aphrodite is married to the ugly god Hephaestus, Aphrodite states that Hephaestus has other "charms". She tells them that she will not be attending the wedding as there is little love in Hell.

Powers and abilities
As a deity, vast supernatural abilities including size-changing, shapeshifting, and immortality. He also possesses super-speed thanks to his winged sandals.

In other media
Hermes appears in the Justice League Unlimited episode "The Balance", voiced by Jason Bateman. When Wonder Woman goes to her room on board the Justice League Watchtower, she sees someone in the dark that she thought was Flash only to discover that it was Hermes. He gives her a message from Zeus stating that something has gone wrong in Tartarus and she is required to return to Themyscira to stop the threat in order prevent it from threatening the world. In the company of Hawkgirl, Wonder Woman arrived on Themyscira where she used the message that Hermes gave her to explain to her mother why she had to violate her mother's exile decree. This causes Hippolyta to allow Wonder Woman to help out as she and Hawkgirl enter Tartarus.

Hermes is featured in DC Universe Online.

Hermes appears in the comic book adaption of DC Super Hero Girls.

References

External links
 Hermes at DC Comics Wiki

Comics characters introduced in 1942
DC Comics characters who are shapeshifters
DC Comics characters who can move at superhuman speeds
DC Comics characters who can teleport 
DC Comics characters who use magic
DC Comics characters with superhuman strength
DC Comics deities
DC Comics male characters
Fictional characters who can change size
Fictional characters with immortality
Fictional gods
Classical mythology in DC Comics
Greek and Roman deities in fiction
Characters created by H. G. Peter
Characters created by William Moulton Marston
Hermes